Carlo Acutis (3 May 1991 – 12 October 2006) was an English-born Italian Catholic youth and amateur computer programmer, who is best known for documenting Eucharistic miracles around the world and cataloguing them onto a website which he created before his death from leukemia. He was noted for his cheerfulness, computer skills, and deep devotion to the Eucharist, which became a core theme of his life. He was beatified on 10 October 2020, two days before the 14th anniversary of his death.

Life

Carlo Acutis was born in London, England, on 3 May 1991, to a wealthy Italian family. His baptism took place on 18 May 1991 in the church of Our Lady of Dolours, Chelsea. His parents, Andrea Acutis and Antonia Salzano, who were not especially religious, had worked in London and Germany, finally settled in Milan in September 1991, not long after their first son's birth. In 1995, when Acutis was four years old, his maternal grandfather died and was said to have appeared to him in a dream asking to be prayed for. When the child displayed an interest in Catholic religious practice, his questions were answered by the family's Polish babysitter. Three years later he requested to receive his First Communion at the age of seven. After consulting a prelate and providing instruction, the family arranged this at the convent of Sant'Ambrogio ad Nemus. After that he made an effort, either before or after Mass, to reflect before the tabernacle. Acutis became a frequent communicant and would make a weekly confession. He is said to have had several models as guides for his life, especially Francis of Assisi, as well as Francisco and Jacinta Marto, Dominic Savio, Tarcisius, and Bernadette Soubirous.

He was educated in Milan at the Jesuit Instituto Leone XIII high school. On the social side, Acutis would worry about friends of his whose parents were divorcing and would invite them to his home to support them. He defended disabled peers at school when bullies mocked them. Outside school, he did volunteer work with the homeless and destitute. He also liked films, comic editing, and playing PlayStation video games. Although he immensely enjoyed travel, the town of Assisi remained a favorite.

Those around him considered him a "computer geek" on account of his passion and skill with computers and the internet. Acutis applied himself to creating a website dedicated to cataloging each reported Eucharistic miracle in the world. He completed this in 2005, having started compiling the catalog at the age of eleven. He admired Giacomo Alberione's initiatives to use the media to evangelize and proclaim the Gospel and aimed to do likewise with the website he had created. 

When Carlo developed leukemia, he offered his suffering both for Pope Benedict XVI and for the Catholic Church, saying: "I offer to the Lord the sufferings that I will have to undergo for the Pope and for the Church." He had asked his parents to take him on pilgrimages to the sites of all the known Eucharistic miracles in the world, but his declining health prevented this from happening.
The doctors treating Carlo's final illness had asked him if he was in great pain, a question to which he responded that "there are people who suffer much more than me". Carlo died on 12 October 2006 at 06:45 p.m. He was 15 years old at the time of his death. He was buried in Assisi in accordance with his wishes.

Legacy 
Acutis's mother, Antonia, is said to attribute to his intercession the fact that, at the age of 44, she gave birth to twins, born precisely four years to the day after his death. Following the Catholic Church's recognition of a miracle in 2020, attributed to Acutis, Antonia told the press that her son had appeared to her in dreams saying that he will not only be beatified but also canonized a saint in the future.

Photo exhibition of eucharistic miracles
In memory of Acutis, bishops Raffaello Martinelli and Angelo Comastri have helped to organize a traveling photo exhibition of all the Eucharistic miracle sites. It has since traveled to dozens of different countries across five continents.

Parish of Blessed Carlo Acutis
On 15 December 2020, under the provisions of Canon Law, Archbishop Bernard Longley established a new parish in the Archdiocese of Birmingham under the patronage of the Blessed Carlo Acutis. The parish incorporates the three churches of St Peter & Paul, St Michael and St Bernadette in Wolverhampton. 

In July 2021, the parishes of St. John Berchmans in Logan Square, Chicago, and St. Hedwig in Bucktown combined under the patronage of Blessed Carlo Acutis.

Other
In April 2022, the first life-sized statue of Acutis in the United Kingdom was erected at Carfin Grotto, North Lanarkshire, Scotland.

Beatification

The call for him to be beatified began not long after Acutis's death. The campaign gained momentum in 2013 after he was named a Servant of God, the first stage on the path towards sainthood.  The Lombardy Episcopal Conference approved the petition for the official canonization cause to proceed at a meeting in 2013. The opening of the diocesan investigation was held on 15 February 2013, with Cardinal Angelo Scola inaugurating the process, and concluding it on 24 November 2016. The formal introduction to the cause occurred on 13 May 2013, and Acutis became titled a "Servant of God". Pope Francis next confirmed his life as one of heroic virtue on 5 July 2018, and declared him Venerable. 

On 14 November 2019, the Vatican's Medical Council of the Congregation for the Causes of Saints expressed a positive opinion about a miracle in Brazil attributed to Acutis's intercession. Luciana Vianna had taken her son, Mattheus, who was born with a pancreatic defect that made eating difficult, to a prayer service. Beforehand, Vianna had already prayed a novena asking for the teenager Acutis's intercession. During the service, her son had asked that he should not "throw up as much". Immediately following the service, Mattheus told his mother that he felt healed and asked for solid food when he came home. Until then he had been on an all-liquid diet. After a detailed investigation, Pope Francis confirmed the miracle's authenticity in a decree on 21 February 2020, leading to Acutis's beatification. 

Within a month of the decree, the beatification ceremony was postponed due to the COVID-19 pandemic in Italy, during which the country was placed on lockdown. It was rescheduled for 10 October 2020 and was held in the Upper Church of the Basilica of Saint Francis of Assisi in Assisi, Italy, with Cardinal Agostino Vallini presiding on the Pope's behalf. , the postulator for Acutis's cause is Nicola Gori.

Since the beatification ceremony on 10 October 2020, silent crowds have been filing past the exposed relics of the blessed youth in the one-time cathedral of Assisi, the church of Santa Maria Maggiore.

See also 

 List of beatified people

References

External links

 Association of Friends of Carlo Acutis – Official Site
 Wolverhampton Parish of Blessed Carlo Acutis – Incorporating the churches of St Peter & Paul, St Michael and St Bernadette. 
 Eucharistic Miracles – List of Eucharistic miracles catalogued by Acutis
 The apparitions of Our Lady – List of Marian apparitions catalogued by Acutis
 2006 Hagiography Circle

1991 births
2006 deaths
20th-century Italian people
20th-century Roman Catholics
21st-century Italian people
21st-century Roman Catholics
21st-century venerated Christians
Beatifications by Pope Francis
Deaths from cancer in Lombardy
Deaths from acute myeloid leukemia
Italian beatified people
Italian computer programmers
Italian Roman Catholics
English beatified people
English computer programmers
English Roman Catholics
People from London
People from Milan
Venerated Catholics by Pope Francis
English people of Italian descent
English emigrants to Italy
Citizens of Italy through descent